The 2016 Walsall Metropolitan Borough Council election took place on 5 May 2016 to elect members of Walsall Metropolitan Borough Council in England. This was on the same day as other local elections.

Results

Aldridge Central and South

References

2016 English local elections
2016
2010s in the West Midlands (county)